Siaosi Tuʻipelehake (born Siaosi Fatafehi Toutaitokotaha) was a politician from Tonga who briefly served as Prime Minister of Tonga in January 1905. Tu'ipelehake is a traditional very high-ranking Tongan title. He was the 4th Tu'ipelehake.

He was the father of George Tupou II and a grandson of George Tupou I.

Family tree

References 

Prime Ministers of Tonga
Tongan royalty
19th-century Tongan people